The Belgian Third Division B was one of the two leagues at the third level of the Belgian football league system, the other one being the Belgian Third Division A.  This division existed from the 1952–53 until 2015–16 seasons and was played every year with 18 clubs from 2009.  Prior to this, the third level in the Belgian football league system was called Promotion and was divided into four leagues of 16 clubs each and prior to the 1931–32 season, the Promotion was divided into three leagues. Due to restructuring, the Third Division was replaced by Belgian Second Amateur Division which plays as three leagues of 16 clubs each from the 2016–17 season.

The final clubs

 — Refused promotion by declining to apply for a remunerative license 
 — R.R.C. Hamoir won in the first round of the Promotion play-off

Past winners
1953: R. Uccle Sport
1954: S.R. Union Verviers
1955: R.R.C. Tournaisien
1956: K. Patro Eisden
1957: K.S.C. Eendracht Aalst
1958: R.F.C. Sérésien
1959: K. Olse Merksem S.C.
1960: Union Royale Namur
1961: K.F.C. Herentals
1962: R. Crossing Club Molenbeek
1963: K. Boom F.C.
1964: K. Sint-Niklase S.K.
1965: R.F.C. Sérésien
1966: S.K. Beveren-Waas
1967: R.R.C. Tirlemont
1968: R.C.S. Brugeois
1969: S.V. Sottegem
1970: K.A.S. Eupen
1971: K. Boom F.C.
1972: K.F.C. Winterslag
1973: A.S. Oostende
1974: K.V.G. Oostende
1975: K. Patro Eisden
1976: K.A.S. Eupen
1977: K.S.C. Hasselt
1978: K.R.C. Harelbeke
1979: K. Hoeselt V.V.
1980: R.F.C. Sérésien
1981: K. Witgoor Sport Dessel
1982: V.V. Overpelt Fabriek
1983: K. Wuustwezel F.C.
1984: K. Patro Eisden
1985: K.F.C. Verbroedering Geel
1986: F.C. Assent
1987: K.F.C. Lommelse S.K.
1988: K.F.C. Germinal Ekeren
1989: F.C. Zwarte Leeuw
1990: K.F.C. Turnhout
1991: R.F.C. Sérésien
1992: K. Beerschot V.A.V.
1993: K.V.C. Westerlo
1994: K. Patro Eisden
1995: K.F.C. Tielen
1996: R. Tilleur F.C. Liégeois
1997: K.F.C. Dessel Sport
1998: K.F.C. Herentals
1999: K.V.K. Tienen
2000: K.S.K. Heusden-Zolder
2001: R.E. Virton
2002: K.A.S. Eupen
2003: A.F.C. Tubize
2004: R. Union Saint-Gilloise
2005: K.V.S.K. United Overpelt-Lommel
2006: K.V.K. Tienen
2007: R.O.C. de Charleroi-Marchienne
2008: R.F.C. de Liège
2009: K.F.C. Turnhout
2010: C.S. Visé
2011: WS Woluwe
2012: K.F.C. Dessel Sport
2013: R.E. Virton
2014: K.V. Woluwe-Zaventem
2015: R. Cappellen F.C. (declined promotion)

See also
Belgian Second Division
Belgian Third Division A
Belgian Fourth Division
Belgian football league system

References

External links
 RSSSF Archive – Third division final tables (1952–2000)
 Sport.be website – Results, standings, stats and fixtures

B